Michael is a 2023 Indian  neo-noir action thriller film written and directed by Ranjit Jeyakodi, and produced by Karan C Entertainments and Sree Venkateswara Cinemas. The film features Sundeep Kishan, Vijay Sethupathi, Divyansha Kaushik, Gautham Vasudev Menon, Varun Sandesh, Varalaxmi Sarathkumar, and Ayyappa P. Sharma. The film was shot in Telugu and was partially reshot in Tamil.

Michael was released on 3 February 2023 in Telugu and Tamil, with dubbed releases in Hindi, Malayalam and Kannada languages.

Plot 
In the 1980s, Michael is a gangster, who is mentored by the Bombay-based crime boss Gurunath, and raised by his right-hand man Swamy. However, he is always rebuffed by Gurunath's son, Amarnath, and wife, Charulatha. 

One day, Gurunath gets attacked by a gang, where he learns that his rival, Rathan, was behind the attack. Gurunath sends Michael to Delhi to kill Rathan and his daughter, Theera. However, Michael falls in love with Theera and decides not kill Rathan. One night, Michael, Theera, and Rathan are captured and brought to Amarnath. He reveals that he orchestrated the attack on his father, to take over his position. He also tells Michael that Theera was earlier pretending to love Michael, but now she truly loves him. Amarnath kills Rathan and shoots Michael, gravely injuring him. Amarnath's men throw him into the sea. 

However, Michael survives and arrives at Amarnath's hideout. He injures and kills almost all of Amarnath's men, before killing Amarnath himself. He later walks away with Theera. Michael reveals about Amarnath's death at his hands, to Gurunath, who swears to exact revenge. Charulatha and Gurunath go to Amarnath's hideout, to collect his body. Gurunath announces a bounty to kill Michael and Theera, in exchange for his position. Michael and Theera are taken in by Kannamma and her husband, a retired police officer, to hide from Gurunath's men. Kannamma's husband calls Gurunath and lets him know that Michael and Theera are staying with him. 

Gurunath sends his men to kill them, however upon arrival, they are hoodwinked by Kanamma's husband, where he, along with Kannamma, finish off Gurunath's men. Kannamma and her husband reveal to Theera that Michael's mother, Jennifer, a singer, was having an affair with Gurunath and was oblivious of the fact that he was already married to Charulatha. Jennifer became pregnant with Michael, of which Charulatha came to know about, enraging her. She tried to kill her by setting her house on fire, but Jennifer managed to survive and worked as a cook in a prison, raising Michael in the process. 

Michael learnt about his mother's past and purposely gained Gurunath's attention to work for him, in order to kill him at the right time. Swamy also knew about his past and was helping him all along. Michael heads back to Bombay and confronts Gurunath at his mansion, where he reveals his relation to him and about Amarnath's attempt to take over him. Michael later kills both Charulatha and Gurunath, thus avenging the injustice caused to his mother. Later, Michael reunites with Theera and takes over Gurunath's empire, becoming the new crime boss of Bombay. Later, Swamy is kidnapped by a new gang led by Gurunath's twin brother. Gurunath had kept this a secret from everyone except Charulatha. After learning about Michael, he tells Swamy that he will come for him, swearing revenge for his brother.

Cast

Music
The music of the film is composed by Sam C. S.

Release
The film was released in theatres on February 3, 2023. The digital rights were sold to Aha, while the satellite rights of the Tamil and Telugu version were sold to Star Network. The film was premiered on Aha from 24 February 2023.

Reception 
Neeshita Nyayapati of The Times of India gave 3 out of 5 stars and wrote "Michael is a genre film that achieves what it sets out to do – tell a dark coming-of-age tale of a young man who knows what it means to be human for better or worse. Watch it if that’s your kind of cinema." Latha Srinivasan of India Today gave 2.5 out of 5 stars and wrote "Michael is a gangster flick that’s more style than story for the most part. Having said that, Sundeep Kishan, Vijay Sethupathi and Sam CS are the absolute highlights of this film."

Thinkal Menon of OTTplay gave 2.5 out of 5 stars and wrote "Michael is a mish-mash of several home-made gangster films which have entertained in the past. The movie is a wasted opportunity and might appeal to hardcore action lovers who do not mind enjoying old wine in a new bottle."

References

External links 

2023 films
2020s Telugu-language films
Indian neo-noir films
2023 action thriller films
Indian action thriller films
Films set in Mumbai
Indian films about revenge
Films scored by Sam C. S.
Fictional portrayals of the Maharashtra Police
Films set in Delhi
Films shot in Hyderabad, India
Indian films about cannabis